Museum on the Seam is a socio-political contemporary art museum in Jerusalem, Israel.

About the museum
Founded in 1999, Museum on the Seam is housed in a neo-classical building designed by Andoni Baramki, a Palestinian Arab architect who built it as a family residence. The property was appropriated by Israel after 1948. According to the museum website, the museum focuses on "controversial social issues for public discussion,” with exhibitions on social issues like the right to protest, the decline of Western hegemony, and state/private home relationships. 

Museum on the Seam has been cited by The New York Times as one of the world's 29 cultural 'one must-see-before-I-die destinations.' According to its public presentations, it brings social and moral change in face of a complex and conflict-ridden reality.

The museum was established by Raphie Etgar who serves as its artistic director. It has been supported for decades by the Holtzbrink Family Foundation. through the Jerusalem Foundation. 
Leading contemporary artists have shown their work at this museum, including Anselm Kiefer, Bruce Nauman, Bill Viola, Christian Boltanski, Sophie Calle, Wim Wenders, Thomas Hirschhorn, Gilbert & George, Paul McCarthy, Barbara Kruger, Jenny Holzer, Douglas Gordon, William Kentridge, Santiago Sierra, Alfredo Jaar, Edward Burtynsky, Yael Bartana, Michal Rovner, Dani Karavan, Moshe Gershuni, Micha Ullman, Joshua Neustein, Larry Abramson, Sigalit Landau, Tsibi Geva, Menashe Kadishman, Miki Kratsman, Gilad Ophir, Michal Na'aman and many others.

History of the building

Baramki family home
The house was built to serve as his home by the Christian Arab architect Andoni Baramki in 1932, on one dunam of property purchased from the Turjman family. The Baramki family was forced to flee as refugees, after a stray bullet almost killed the architect's wife while she was sitting in her living room, during the 1948 Palestinian exodus during the 1948 Arab–Israeli War.

Israeli military outpost
The Baramki home was turned into an Israeli military outpost, called the "Tourjman Post" situated on the border or no man's land between Israel and Jordan overlooking the Mandelbaum Gate, which served as the only passage between the two parts of the divided city at the time. The finely wrought window arches were filled with concrete to form turrets. During the battles of the 1967 War, the house suffered hits from shells and bullets which left their marks on the building and are apparent to this day.

At war's end, the Baramkis crossed over with their keys and title-deeds but were rebuffed. As was the case with the Turjmans, all efforts by Andoni and his son Gabi Baramki, longtime President of Birzeit University in the West Bank, to return to and repossess the family home through recourse in Israeli courts, failed. The reasons were various: it was claimed initially that the site was required for military security, then that it was in a hazardous state, in need of substantial repairs, and finally that it fell under Israeli laws in a united Jerusalem, and, despite their presence, the family were classified as absentee property owners. Gabi Baramki was allowed only one visit, in 1999. and Baramki regarded it as "stolen property".

Military museum
In the year 1981 the military outpost was renovated and renamed as the "Tourjman Post Museum" commemorating the reunification of the city. The museum mounted exhibits of the guns, mortars and other weapons used in its defense.

Tolerance museum
In the year 1999 the building underwent change and a new permanent exhibition, calling for tolerance and mutual understating between people in the region, was displayed. On the day of its dedication, it was opened ostensibly as a site for 'peace, tolerance,... dialogue, understanding and coexistence'.

Socio-political art museum
Since 2005, the building serves as a home to the Museum on the Seam - a socio-political contemporary art museum dedicated to dialogue and mutual understanding.

Exhibitions
 2005- DEAD END which dealt with the violence within Israeli society.
 2006- EQUAL AND LESS EQUAL that focused on the issues of discrimination exploitation and humiliation.
 2007- BARE LIFE about the personal and public consequences of a prolong state of emergency that becomes legitimized;
 2008- HEARTQUAKE that examined the central role of anxiety in human interactions with their surroundings, thus examining the dynamics of social and political interactions.
 2009- NATURE NATION that dealt with the complexity of encounters between humans with their natural environment. 
 2010- THE RIGHT TO PROTEST  about the obligation that comes with the privilege of protest. 
 2011- WEST END about the clash of civilizations between Islam and the west and the possible consequences.
 2012- BEYOND MEMORY faces the viewers with works of art that expose images delved from the archives of repression and denial of fears and anxieties from our past experiences, in an attempt to learn from them how to avoid repeating past mistakes. 
 2013- FLESH & BLOOD that calls upon us to look at flesh and blood as a fabric that connects all living beings to one family and to treat it with respect and compassion.
 2013- EVERYONE CARRIES A ROOM INSIDE that examines loneliness as a major contemporary phenomenon, gaining more and more impact on people’s lives.
 2014- AND THE TREES WENT FORTH TO SEEK A KING critically examines the complex inter-relationship between leaders and their subjects.
 2015- UNPROTECTED ZONE about the responsibility and the ability of the individual to alter and influence his own future and his surroundings. The exhibition also deals with the question to what extent does the establishment and society intervenes in restricting the individual and shaping his world. 
 2017-THOU SHALT NOT which dealt with the interaction between the world of faith and the world of art, and served as a mirror depicting our times and their constant change.
 2018- THE WOMEN BEHIND about the inner world of women, while identifying cases of subjugation and discrimination that mostly occur in the private and public spheres.
 2019- THE CASE OF HIROSHIMA about the consequences of a total annihilation which the humanity produces, and the discussion issues of identity and ethics.
 2019- EVEN THE TREES BLEED about the aesthetic, cultural, national and political meanings between trees and men, and their interdependence upon one another.
 2019- JERUSALEM - SELF PORTRAIT the story of a city which brings together different people who though may be poles apart.
 2019- DEMOCRACY NOW has democracy become a synonym for corruption?
 2019- THE UNCANNY about the terrible trauma we simultaneously dreads and are attracted to.
 2019- THE CRYING GAME about the horrors that lie a step or two away from the lives that most of us live.
 2020- REBIRTH contemplates the natural forces and their innermost being, offering a moving experience of the process of creation in which the spirit is briefly touched and we are reborn.
 2020- PINCHAS COHEN GAN a personal confession of an individual, expressing his critique and conveys a sense of existential meaning in a society consumed with its cultural and ethical difficulties.
 2020- METROPOLIS about humankind’s race to reach further and higher.
 2020- GOLEM is humankind on the verge of a struggle for control versus man-made machines, which are beginning to form their own independent thoughts?
 2020- WASTELAND about the reality in light of the recent grave natural phenomena which are threatening our planet’s existence.
 2020- NOT BY THE DRESS ALONE do we make the clothes or do the clothes make us?
 2021- LIFE/STILL LIFE/LAND A tension ridden reality of the aggressive and divided Israeli society, which is prone to violent conflicts.
 2021- EXAMPLES TO FOLLOW (Curator: Adrienne Goehler) The exhibition deals with different layers of climate change, encourages a vision of a sustainable lifestyle and emphasizes the idea that every person can be a part of the green revolution.
 2022- AFFECTED (Curator: Alon Razgour) The exhibition captures the artistic frame of mind in times of plague and crisis, and describes how the world is shaped by the new reality. 
 2022- ALWAYS HAVE BEEN, ALWAYS WILL BE (Curator: Dveer Shaked) seeks to tell the wide and varied local LGBTQ story, through the historical timeline on the one hand, and through the space axis on the other hand.
 2022- ALPHA (Curator: Shahar Shalev) presents a wide range of views on Israeli masculinity, which express the changing discourse on the subject.
 2022- KINGS OF THE HILL (Curator: Shahar Shalev) explores initiation and naturalization ceremonies, through symbols and rituals closely related to the value system of modern Israeli society and culture.  
 2022- CLOSE (Curator: Avital Wexler) offers us a space that contains the wild and raw alongside aesthetic restraint and order while hinting at, or explicitly referencing, the female body.
 2023- THE JERUSALEM SYNDROME (Curator: Andrzej Wajs) brings together a rich archive of interviews conducted by the artist Katarzyna Kozyra with extraordinary individuals who believe themselves to be Messiahs.

In 2000 Museum on the Seam produces, as an initiative by Raphie Etgar, the exhibition COEXISTANCE: an international project that incorporates many leading poster designers from around the globe. The project was displayed in over 35 cities in different continents and called for mutual understanding between fellow nations and religions. Its global Journey was endorsed and supported by world leaders and thinkers.

See also
 Coexist (image)
 Visual arts in Israel

References

Further reading

 Deadend (editors: Romi Shapira, Hila Tsabari and Hadas Zohar), Museum on the Seam, 2005.
 Bare Life (editor: Roy Brand), Museum on the Seam, 2007. 
 HeartQuake (editor: Nitzan Rothem), Museum on the Seam, 2008. 
 Nature Nation (editor: Einat Manof), Museum on the Seam, 2009.
 HomeLessHome (editor: Ariella Azoulay), Museum on the Seam, 2010.
 The Right to Protest (editor: Avi Katzman), Museum on the Seam, 2010.
 West End (editor: Uriya Shavit), Museum on the Seam, 2011. 
 Beyond Memory (editor: Zvi Carmeli), Museum on the Seam, 2012. 
 Flesh & Blood (editor: Ariel Tsovel), Museum on the Seam, 2013.
 Everyone Carries a Room Inside (editor: Einat Ofir), Museum on the Seam, 2013.
 And the Trees Went Forth to Seek a King (editor: Micha Popper), Museum on the Seam, 2014.

External links
 Museum on the Seam Online Shop 
 Coexistence Exhibition website
 Barry Davis, The Ups and Downs of Government: “And the Trees Went Forth to Seek a King” Exhibition, The Jerusalem Post, 31 July 2014.
 Yair Amichai-Hamburger, Loneliness in the Digital Age: "Everyone Carries a Room Inside Exhibition", The Jerusalem Post, 13 November 2013.
 Museum on the Seam- One of Israel's 10 Best Museums, CNN, 29 January 2013.
 Akin Ajayi, Jerusalem Museum Straddles the Line Between Art and Politics, Haaretz, 23 November 2012. 
 Art Can Help to Prevent Future Catastrophes, Bloomberg TV, 7 May 2012.
 Saudi Artist Targeted Over Jerusalem , The Art Newspaper, 9 November 2011.
 Robert Fisk, Palestine, Yes, but Israelis Draw the Line at Jerusalem, The Independent, 27 September 2011.
 Israeli Museum Showing Muslim-World Artists, Yahoo News, 2 August 2011.
 A Museum with Edge, The Jerusalem Post, 17 July 2011.
 10 Unique Museums Off the Beaten Path, National Geographic, 11 May 2010.
 Coexistance Exhibition is Displayed in the Quad Cities, 31 August 2007.
 Coexistence: Political Art in Auckland's Britomart, Thread-NZ: Culture Latestnews.
 No Boundaries - "Coexistence: The Art of Living Together" Merges Art, Education, & Controversy, River Cities' Reader, 15 August 2007. 
 The Hartford Hosts COEXISTENCE on Asylum Hill: Internationally Acclaimed Exhibition Comes to Insurer's World Headquarters in Connecticut, The Corporate Social Responsibility Newswire, 11 April 2007.
 The Cycle that Needs to be Broken, Scoop Culture, 31 January 2006.
 Artists Encourage Coexistence Through Art Near Old Main, Arizona Daily Wildcat, 3 February 2005.
 Artists, Writers Call for 'Coexistence' around the World,   Business Wire, 20 September 2004.
 'Coexistence' Exhibit Defaced, St. Petersburg Times, 15 December 2003.
 Arts & Culture Israeli Exhibit on Coexistence Gets Warm Welcome in South Africa, The Global Jewish News, 31 March 2003.
"Coexistence" Comes to Bern, Swiss Info, 18 April 2002.

Museums in Jerusalem
Art museums and galleries in Israel
Art museums established in 1999
1999 establishments in Israel
Contemporary art galleries in Israel